The 1993 World Table Tennis Championships men's doubles was the 42nd edition of the men's doubles championship.

Wang Tao and Lü Lin won the title after defeating Ma Wenge and Zhang Lei in the final by three sets to one. The matches were best of five sets from the quarter final stage.

Results

See also
List of World Table Tennis Championships medalists

References

-